Michael Basse (April 14, 1957, Bad Salzuflen) is a German writer. He has published novels, poems, essays and audiobooks, as well as poetry translated from English, French and Bulgarian (including John F. Deane, Blaga Dimitrova and Lyubomir Nikolov).

Early life 
Basse grew up in North Rhine-Westphalia, Lower Saxony and Baden-Württemberg. He earned his university-entrance diploma in 1976 at the Evangelical Seminaries of Maulbronn and Blaubeuren. Between 1977 and 1979,  Basse worked as a trainee in the editorial department of Schwäbische Zeitung. Thereafter he worked at Süddeutscher Rundfunk (SDR) in Stuttgart. In 1984 he moved to Munich and began studying philosophy at the LMU, where he graduated in 1990 with a master's degree. In 1984, Basse was one of the co-founders of the Munich Office of Literature and was part of the board of directors for four years.

In the 90s and 2000, Basse introduced numerous authors in the Poetry Cabinet Munich, among them Anise Koltz and Jean Portante, Eva Hesse and Mary de Rachewiltz, daughter and editor of the works of Ezra Pound. From 1993 to 2015, Basse worked as a freelancer in the Cultural Critics Department of Bayerischer Rundfunk. From 1994 to 1999 he contributed reviews to the literary supplement of Sueddeutsche Zeitung on a regular basis. Since 2015 he has focused on his work as a novelist.

Literary work 
Basse’s first collection of poems, And in the morning there is still news (1992, 1994 2nd ed.) was well received and he was characterized as "a powerful lyric poet who looks at the particles of reality under the magnifying glass". Basse's early lyrics were strongly influenced by his former mentor, Johannes Poethen; In spite of this, it was observed that "he does not abandon rhythm and verse, but always remains in the realm of everyday life, facts".

The second volume of poetry by Basse was described as "a kind of poetic cartography". In The Conquest Does Not Take Place (1997) he uses the form of poems in prose for the first time. Painting, dance and music are also repeatedly included in the poems. The reader of Basse’s Sea in Mind feels like the viewer of Caspar David Friedrich’s The Monk by the Sea: “As if his eyelids were ripped out.” In secondary literature, Basse’s second volume was also praised for its formal stylistic stringency: “Poems in prose without periods or commas.”

His third collection of poems, Partisan Feelings (2004) was composed in a form Basse called lyrical protocols: Texts or speech acts completely synthesized that combine different levels of discourse and reality. After another volume of poems in prose (Splendid People, 2008), Basse returned in his fifth – and for now last – book of poems, Skype Connected (2010), to shorter poetic forms. Like in his lyrical protocols, he sticks closely to everyday spoken language. At the heart of this collection of love poems is, according to the internet portal Fixpoetry, "the mature love of two people (...) who, from time to time, question everything one could possibly question. "His love poems generate their intimacy - and emotional, as well as media-historic timeliness - out of the spiritual abyss of human alienness and territorial distance; healing moments come from Italy, which Basse - as a brother in spirit of Pasolini - envisions in a radical anti-idyllic way."

In 2010, Basse published his first novel, Career, in which he takes a critical look at the German left during the 80s and 90s.

In 2016 he published his second novel, American Zone, which reflects the problematic German-American relationship. According to Stuttgarter Zeitung this is: “An authentic and historically precise genre picture for the period of 1944 to 2003."

Michael Basse's poems have been translated into several languages, including English, Hungarian and Dutch.

References

External links 

 Literature by Michael Basse in the catalogue of the German National Library
 Michael Basse's homepage
 A short biography and review of Michael Basse's works on poetenladen
 Michael Basse on the Bavarian Literature Portal (a project of the Bavarian State Library)
 Michael Basse on the Poetry Cabinet Munich's webpage
 Michael Basse in Wespennest – Zeitschrift für brauchbare Texte, Vienna

Living people
1957 births
German poets